QantasLink is a regional airline brand of Australian airline Qantas and is an affiliate member of the Oneworld airline alliance. It is a major competitor to Regional Express Airlines and Virgin Australia Regional Airlines. As of September 2010 QantasLink provided 1,900 flights each week to 54 domestic locations.

History
QantasLink's origins as a single brand for Qantas' regional airline subsidiaries go back to October 1993, when Qantas acquired Australian Airlink Pty Ltd and its fleet from parent company National Jet Systems, which up to that point had been operating flights on major regional routes for Australian Airlines. The Australian Airlink name remained and the fleet was repainted in Qantas livery, and National Jet Systems was subsequently contracted by Qantas to operate Australian Airlink aircraft.

Prior to 2002, Qantas' various subsidiaries operated under their own names, eventually adopting the Australian Airlines, and later, Qantas liveries. In 2002 a common brand was created, encompassing AirLink (a franchise, operated by National Jet Systems), Sunstate Airlines, Eastern Australia Airlines, and Southern Australia Airlines; Southern Australia has since ceased operations.

For a short while, QantasLink took over some of Qantas' non-trunk routes, such as Sydney - Sunshine Coast, using Boeing 717s that were inherited after Qantas acquired Impulse Airlines. QantasLink ceased operating some of these routes after Qantas formed low-cost subsidiary Jetstar Airways, transferring the Boeing 717 aircraft and routes to the new airline. In 2005/06, eight of the 717s were returned to QantasLink following Jetstar's acquisition of Airbus A320 aircraft, to be operated in Western Australia, Northern Territory and far north Queensland by National Jet Systems.

On 31 July 2015, Network Aviation was rebranded to QantasLink. This was announced by Qantas with the unveiling of a Fokker 100 in QantasLink colours.

In January 2018, Network Aviation confirmed it would lease two Airbus A320s from Jetstar Airways for flights to and from Perth as part of the QantasLink brand.

On 20 May 2020, Qantas announced the purchase of Cobham Australia's National Jet Systems subsidiary which had operated the Boeing 717-200 on behalf of QantasLink for 15 years, bringing both employees and the fleet in-house.

On 4 February 2021, Qantas announced that they will be leasing 3 Embraer E190 with the option for up to 14 to operate on routes like Adelaide-Alice Springs, Darwin-Alice Springs, and Darwin-Adelaide.

Fleet

Current fleet
QantasLink flights, except those flown by the Embraer 190s, are operated by the individual airlines that make up the group - Eastern Australia Airlines, National Jet Systems, Network Aviation and Sunstate Airlines. All flights use QF IATA codes. Turboprop aircraft operate under the ICAO callsign QLK ("Q-LINK"). Until 5 January 2009, Eastern and Sunstate operated under their own callsigns. Network Aviation aircraft operate under their own callsign NWK ("NETLINK"). Boeing 717s operate under the callsign QJE ("Q-JET"). , QantasLink operates the following aircraft:

Former fleet
QantasLink previously operated the following types:
 BAe 146-100
 BAe 146-200
 BAe 146-300
 de Havilland Canada Dash 8-100

Gallery

Fleet development
QantasLink increased capacity by replacing many of its smaller Dash 8-100 and Q200 aircraft with Q400s. QantasLink pursued this deal despite landing gear problems with Q400 aircraft by some airlines. This problem also saw a grounding of the Q400s by QantasLink, though all were deemed safe and returned to service.

As part of its further expansion, QantasLink entered the South Australian market in December 2005, with flights from Adelaide to Port Lincoln and Kangaroo Island. Interstate flights were also introduced between Kangaroo Island and Melbourne. Due to low passenger loads, these services ceased operation at the end of June 2006, however QantasLink announced a resumption of Melbourne to Kangaroo Island from December 2017 alongside opening up Adelaide to Kangaroo Island flights. On 8 December 2009, QantasLink announced that it would re-enter the Adelaide to Port Lincoln market from February 2010, using Q400 aircraft flying 23 return services a week.

Since 2005, QantasLink 717 services in Western Australia, Queensland, New South Wales, Australian Capital Territory, Northern Territory and Tasmania have been contracted to National Jet Systems, using the QantasLink brand. The hubs for QantasLink under the contract are in Perth, Western Australia, Cairns, Queensland, Brisbane, Queensland, Sydney, New South Wales, Canberra, Australian Capital Territory and Hobart, Tasmania.

Qantas replaced its daily Melbourne-Launceston mainline service with a three times daily QantasLink Dash 8 service from 1 August 2006. This has now been increased to a four times daily service, supplemented in peak service periods by QantasLink 717 services.

In May 2008, QantasLink announced that it would order nine 717s. Tamworth would be the first New South Wales regional airport to be serviced by the Q400, commencing in mid-August 2008.

On 29 March 2010 QantasLink and the Qantas Group announced that it would start the first international QantasLink route, from Cairns to Port Moresby, utilising Q400 aircraft already based in Cairns. The service commenced in July 2010. A QantasLink spokesperson stated that "the airline would not turn into a fully fledged international airline, but could operate international routes in the future".

On 18 December 2014, QantasLink announced that it would add Whyalla, South Australia, to its network, with double daily flights to commence on 13 April 2015. The route is serviced by the 50-seat Q300. In July 2015, Network Aviation was absorbed into the Qantas Link brand. In November 2014, QantasLink became the first airline to fly to the newly opened Toowoomba Wellcamp Airport, establishing direct Q400 services to Sydney. In February 2016 as a result of strong demand, QantasLink increased weekly services by two flights to fifteen weekly returns.

Alliance Airlines delivered the first of three additional Fokker 100s in July 2016, with two more to be delivered by the end of the year.

In May 2020, Qantas bought National Jet Systems and brought the Boeing 717 crew and fleet in-house. In December 2021, Qantas announced an initial order of 20 Airbus A220-300 with additional purchase options to replace its Boeing 717.

Qantas got five E190's wet leased from Alliance Airlines. All (as of 5 June 2021) in Alliance Livery - with artist impression/rendering of the E190's QantasLink Livery.

Destinations

QantasLink destinations served by Alliance Airlines

Australian Capital Territory
Canberra - Canberra Airport
East Timor
Dili - Dili Airport
New South Wales
Newcastle - Newcastle Airport
Sydney - Sydney Airport
Northern Territory
Alice Springs - Alice Springs Airport
Darwin - Darwin International Airport Hub
Queensland
Cairns - Cairns Airport
Gold Coast - Gold Coast Airport
Townsville - Townsville Airport
Sunshine Coast - Sunshine Coast Airport
South Australia
Adelaide - Adelaide Airport Hub
Tasmania
Hobart - Hobart Airport
Victoria
Melbourne - Melbourne Airport

QantasLink destinations served by Eastern Australia Airlines

Australian Capital Territory
Canberra - Canberra Airport
New South Wales
Albury - Albury Airport
Armidale - Armidale Airport
Ballina - Ballina Byron Gateway Airport
Broken Hill - Broken Hill Airport 
Coffs Harbour - Coffs Harbour Airport
Dubbo - Dubbo City Airport
Griffith - Griffith Airport
Lord Howe Island - Lord Howe Island Airport
Merimbula - Merimbula Airport
Moree - Moree Airport
Orange - Orange Airport
Port Macquarie - Port Macquarie Airport
Sydney - Sydney Airport Hub
Tamworth - Tamworth Airport
Wagga Wagga - Wagga Wagga Airport
Queensland
Brisbane - Brisbane Airport Hub
Hervey Bay - Hervey Bay Airport
Toowoomba - Toowoomba Wellcamp Airport
South Australia
Adelaide - Adelaide Airport Hub
Kingscote - Kingscote Airport 
Mount Gambier - Mount Gambier Airport
Port Lincoln - Port Lincoln Airport
Whyalla - Whyalla Airport
Tasmania
Burnie - Burnie Airport
Devonport - Devonport Airport
Launceston - Launceston Airport
Victoria
Bendigo – Bendigo Airport
Melbourne - Melbourne Airport Hub
Mildura - Mildura Airport

QantasLink destinations served by Sunstate Airlines

Australian Capital Territory
Canberra - Canberra Airport
New South Wales
Albury - Albury Airport
Cooma - Cooma-Snowy Mountains Airport (seasonal)
Newcastle - Newcastle Airport
Sydney - Sydney Airport Hub
Queensland
Barcaldine - Barcaldine Airport
Blackall - Blackall Airport
Brisbane - Brisbane Airport Hub
Bundaberg - Bundaberg Airport
Cairns - Cairns Airport Hub
Cloncurry - Cloncurry Airport
Emerald - Emerald Airport
Gladstone - Gladstone Airport
Hamilton Island - Great Barrier Reef Airport
Hervey Bay - Hervey Bay Airport
Horn Island - Horn Island Airport
Longreach - Longreach Airport
Mackay - Mackay Airport
Moranbah - Moranbah Airport
Mount Isa - Mount Isa Airport
Proserpine - Proserpine Airport
Rockhampton - Rockhampton Airport
Toowoomba - Toowoomba Wellcamp Airport
Townsville - Townsville Airport
Weipa - Weipa Airport
Papua New Guinea
Port Moresby - Port Moresby Airport

QantasLink destinations served by National Jet Systems

Australian Capital Territory
Canberra - Canberra Airport Hub
New South Wales
Coffs Harbour - Coffs Harbour Airport
Sydney -  Sydney Airport Hub
Northern Territory
Alice Springs - Alice Springs Airport
Ayers Rock - Ayers Rock Airport
Darwin - Darwin International Airport
Queensland
Cairns - Cairns Airport
Brisbane - Brisbane Airport Hub
Mackay - Mackay Airport
Rockhampton - Rockhampton Airport
Gold Coast - Gold Coast Airport
Sunshine Coast - Sunshine Coast Airport
Townsville - Townsville Airport
South Australia
Adelaide - Adelaide Airport
Victoria
Melbourne - Melbourne Airport Hub
Western Australia
Broome - Broome International Airport
Kalgoorlie - Kalgoorlie-Boulder Airport
Karratha - Karratha Airport
Newman - Newman Airport
Perth - Perth Airport 
Port Hedland - Port Hedland International Airport
Tasmania
Hobart Airport Hub
Launceston Airport

Incidents
 On 29 May 2003, Qantas Flight 1737, a domestic flight from Melbourne to Launceston operated by a QantasLink Boeing 717 registered VH-NXN, was subject to an attempted hijacking.

See also
Regional airline

Footnotes
Notes
1.  QantasLink flights operated by National Jet Systems use the call-sign "QJET", with the ICAO code QJE.  All flights continue to operate under the IATA code QF.

2.  QantasLink flights operated by Network Aviation do not use an ICAO code and utilise the aircraft registration as a callsign.

References

External links

QantasLink Official Info

Link
Regional airline brands
Oneworld affiliate members
Airlines established in 2002
Australian companies established in 2002
Companies based in Sydney